Giuseppe Caldarola (9 April 1946 – 21 September 2020) was an Italian journalist and politician who served as a Deputy. Caldarola was born in Bari. He was elected to the Chamber of Deputies in the 2001 Italian general election for the Democrats of the Left. In the 2006 general election he was elected to the Chamber for The Olive Tree. In 2007 Caldarola joined the Democratic Party (Italy).

References

1946 births
2020 deaths
Democrats of the Left politicians
Democratic Party (Italy) politicians
Deputies of Legislature XIV of Italy
Deputies of Legislature XV of Italy
Italian journalists
People from Bari